Arșița River may refer to:

Arșița, a tributary of the Ciugheș in Bacău County
Arșița, a tributary of the Dămuc in Neamț County

See also 
 Arșița (disambiguation)
 Arsura River (disambiguation)